Cañar or Cañari is a poorly attested extinct language of the Marañón River basin in Ecuador which is difficult to classify, apart from being apparently related to Puruhá, though it may have been Chimuan or Barbacoan. (See Cañari–Puruhá languages.)  It was the original language of the Cañari people before its replacement by Kichwa and later Spanish.

Cañari substratum in Cañar Quichua
According to Urban (2018), modern-day Cañar Quichua (spoken in Cañar Province, Ecuador) has a Cañari substratum, which can be seen in the phonology and lexicon of the dialect. Below is a list of Cañar Quichua words with Barbacoan lexical parallels, and hence likely to be words of Cañari origin. The words were compiled by Urban (2018) from Cordero (1895), Cordero Palacios (1923), and Paris (1961), and are compared in the table below to words the Barbacoan languages Totoró, Cha'palaa, and Tsafiki as well as Proto-Barbacoan reconstructions.

References

Chimuan languages
Barbacoan languages
Extinct languages of South America